23 skidoo (or 23 skiddoo) may refer to:

 23 skidoo (phrase), an American slang phrase from 1906
 23 Skidoo (band), a British post-punk, ethnic fusion and industrial music band
 23 Skidoo (film), a 1964 short experimental film by Julian Biggs
 Secret Agent 23 Skidoo, American Kid-Hop musician

See also
 Skidoo (disambiguation)
 23 (disambiguation)
 23 enigma